Peter Kaye may refer to:

Peter Kaye (footballer) (born 1979), British footballer
Peter Kaye (businessman), CEO of the Australian Duke of Edinburgh's award

See also
 Peter Kay (born 1973), English comedian, actor and occasional singer